Aston Township is a township in Delaware County, Pennsylvania. The population was 16,592 at the 2010 census.

History
Aston was first settled in 1682 as a municipality and was incorporated as a township in 1688 (one of the first townships in Pennsylvania). Prior to 1687, Aston was known as Northley.  Edward Carter, who was the constable of the township, changed the name from Northley to Aston in remembrance of his old home of Aston in Oxfordshire, England.

In 1906, Aston became a first class township. The current boundaries of Aston were established in 1945 when the northwestern portion of the township seceded to form the borough of Chester Heights.

In colonial times, Concord Road was the main road between Chadds Ford on Brandywine Creek and Chester, Pennsylvania. The Seven Stars Inn, located at Concord Road's "Five Points" intersection, served as  overnight quarters for British General Cornwallis on September 13, 1777, two days after the Battle of the Brandywine as British forces slowly pursued George Washington's army.

The following day three Hessian soldiers were convicted of plundering a local house.  Two, selected by lot, were hung by the third soldier, and the two corpses were left hanging. David Glasgow Farragut frequented the Tavern as a young student in 1817. The Delaware County Odd Fellows were organized there in 1831 and during the 1920s the tavern became a speakeasy. The building was destroyed in 1949 and replaced by a gas station.

A new veterans memorial, dedicated to all veterans who lived in the township (and present-day Chester Heights prior to 1948) from the American Revolution to the present-day Operation Iraqi Freedom, along with Aston Township EMTs, police, and firefighters killed in the line of duty, has been built at the same intersection, opposite the former inn site. An unveiling ceremony occurred on November 11, 2006, with the formal dedication ceremony on April 28, 2007. Endless Pools, a major manufacturer of electric swimming machines, is headquartered and manufactures in Aston Township.

Geography

Aston Township is located in southwestern Delaware County, northwest of Chester Township and southwest of Media, the county seat. The borough of Chester Heights is along the northwest border of the township. Chester Creek, a southeast-flowing tributary of the Delaware River, forms the eastern border of the township.  The township is bordered by the City of Chester to the south.

The township is covered by two ZIP codes: 19014 (Aston Post Office, which also covers parts of Upper Chichester and Bethel townships), and 19063 (Media). Waterways in Aston include a portion of Marcus Hook Creek.

Neumann University (est. 1965), a private co-educational Franciscan college located on the grounds of Our Lady of Angels Convent, is located in the northern portion of the township. Down the road from Neumann University is IceWorks Skating Complex, where the Neumann University Men's and Women's Ice Hockey teams play their home games. Neumann Men's Hockey won the NCAA Division III National Title in 2009, defeating Gustavus in the championship game 4–1 in Lake Placid, New York.

Demographics

As of 2010 census, the racial makeup of the township was 94.3% White, 2.8% African American, 0.1% Native American, 1.6% Asian, 0.3% from other races, and 0.9% from two or more races. Hispanic or Latino of any race were 1.6% of the population .

As of the 2000 census, of 2000, there were 16,203 people, 5,838 households, and 4,285 families residing in the township.  The population density was 2,825.8 people per square mile (1,091.8/km). There were 5,978 housing units at an average density of 1,042.6/sq mi (402.8/km).  The racial makeup of the township was 96.66% White, 1.48% African American, 0.03% Native American, 0.78% Asian, 0.02% Pacific Islander, 0.28% from other races, and 0.75% from two or more races. Hispanic or Latino of any race were 1.01% of the population.

There were 5,838 households, out of which 31.8% had children under the age of 18 living with them, 61.1% were married couples living together, 8.8% had a female householder with no husband present, and 26.6% were non-families. 22.8% of all households were made up of individuals, and 10.6% had someone living alone who was 65 years of age or older.  The average household size was 2.66 and the average family size was 3.15.

In the township, the population was spread out, with 22.8% under the age of 18, 10.0% from 18 to 24, 28.1% from 25 to 44, 24.4% from 45 to 64, and 14.8% who were 65 years of age or older.  The median age was 39 years. For every 100 females, there were 91.2 males.  For every 100 females age 18 and over, there were 87.3 males.

The median income for a household in the township was $57,150, and the median income for a family was $64,938. Males had a median income of $45,585 versus $32,512 for females. The per capita income for the township was $23,206.  About 2.5% of families and 4.7% of the population were below the poverty line, including 5.5% of those under age 18 and 9.2% of those age 65 or over.

Transportation

Pennsylvania Route 452 is the only numbered highway traversing Aston Township. It follows a north-south alignment via Pennell Road through the heart of the township.

Education
Aston Township is a part of the Penn-Delco School District. There are two elementary schools located in the township, Aston Elementary and Pennell Elementary. There is one middle school, Northley Middle. The high school in this district is Sun Valley High School, home of the Vanguards. Aston is also the home of Neumann University, a small Catholic-affiliated liberal arts institution.

Holy Family Regional Catholic School in Aston is the area Catholic school. It formed in 2012 from a merger of St. Joseph Catholic School in Aston and Holy Savior-St. John Fisher Elementary School in Linwood. St. Joseph opened in 1951 with the church basement being the first school location. The dedicated school building opened with a single floor in 1955 and a second floor added in 1959; the first floor had eight classrooms. The building received two additional classrooms and a 1987 addition.

Sports
The Aston Rebels of the North American Hockey League played their home games at the IceWorks Skating Complex from 2015 to 2017.

During the early 1970s, the Aston (Green) Knights played minor league professional football in the Seaboard Football League. Vince Papale and Joe Klecko were among the players that played for the Green Knights.

The Aston Bulls rugby league team played in the American National Rugby League from 1998 to 2013. They played their home games at Sun Valley High School from 2006 to 2013, after relocating from Glen Mills.

Notable people
Ben Agosto, Olympic figure skater
Isaac D. Barnard, former U.S. Senator
Tanith Belbin, Olympic figure skater
Asher Blinkoff, actor, voice actor
Rudy Cerami, professional arena football player
Leah Cevoli, actor
Ben Davis, professional baseball player, San Diego Padres and Seattle Mariners
Gennadi Karponosov, ice dancing coach and former competitor
Robbie Pecorari, American road racer
Samuel Riddle, textile manufacturer

References

External links

Aston Township official website

Townships in Delaware County, Pennsylvania
Townships in Pennsylvania